The Message (Chinese: 风声; pinyin: Fēngshēng, literally "Sound of the Wind") is a 2009 espionage thriller set in 1942 Nanking, featuring a cast of top Chinese stars include Zhou Xun, Li Bingbing, Huang Xiaoming, Zhang Hanyu and Alec Su. The film was adapted from Mai Jia's 2007 novel, The Message (Chinese: 风声; pinyin: Fēngshēng), and was co-directed by Chen Kuo-fu and Gao Qunshu.

In addition to being a blockbuster, The Message has also received extensive critical acclaim and was nominated for a total of thirteen awards at the 2009 Golden Horse Film Festival, 2010 Asian Film Awards, 2010 Hong Kong Film Awards, and 2010 Hundred Flowers Awards. It won the best film award at 17th Beijing University Student Film Festival. Li Bingbing won the Best Leading Actress Award at the 46th Golden Horse Film Awards for her role as the code-breaker chief in this movie.

Plot
April 26, 1940, former Nationalist vice president Wang Jingwei made peace with Japan and set up a Japanese-supported regime during World War II, a puppet government in Nanking. Oct 10, during an anniversary ceremony of the government, a Wang government high official was assassinated, the last in a series of such attacks. Taketa (Huang Xiaoming), chief intelligence officer of the Japanese Imperial Army, believed that it was an action of an underground anti-Japan group and that there was a mole, nicknamed "Old Ghost" (aka The Phantom) inside the Wang government's Anti-Communist Command.

Determined to catch the mole, Taketa sends out a telegram with false information about an opportunity to assassinate a high-ranking officer. When it is apparent that the underground group knows its contents, he arrests the five personnel who saw the telegram, bringing them to the closely guarded fortress Qiu Castle for interrogation. They are:
(1) Anti-Communist squad captain Wu Zhiguo (Zhang Hanyu), 
(2) Bai Xiaonian (Su Youpeng), an aide to the commander, 
(3) chief telegraph decoder Li Ningyu (Li Bingbing), 
(4) mailroom staff Gu Xiaomeng (Zhou Xun), and 
(5) military intelligence director Jin Shenghuo (Ying Da)

Taketa (Huang Xiaoming) and Wang Government's intelligence chief Wang Tianxiang (Wang Zhiwen) need to identify "Old Ghost" in five days. After the suspects are tormented by constant interrogations, they began informing against each other for their own survival. Increasingly horrific physical tortures are used as the interrogators become impatient, while the tormented suspects come close to losing their sanity. A tense game of "cat and mouse" ensues as the Chinese espionage agent attempts to send out a crucial message while protecting their own identity.

Casting

Main cast
Zhou Xun as Gu Xiaomeng
Li Bingbing as Li Ningyu
Zhang Hanyu as Wu Zhiguo
Huang Xiaoming as Takeda (Wutian)
Alec Su as Bai Xiaonian
Wang Zhiwen as Wang Daoxiang
Ying Da as Jin Shenghuo

Supporting cast
Ai Dai 
Liu Jiajia
Liu Weiwei
Shi Zhaoqi
Wu Gang as Liu'ye
Zhu Xu
Zhang Yibai
Duan Yihong
Ni Dahong

Reception
The film earned  at the Chinese box office.

References

External links
 Official website (English): TheMessage2009.com
 Official website (Chinese): Message.hbpictures.com
 

2009 films
2000s spy thriller films
Chinese thriller films
Second Sino-Japanese War films
Films based on Chinese novels
Films directed by Chen Kuo-fu
Films directed by Gao Qunshu
Films with screenplays by Zhang Jialu
Films set in Nanjing
Films scored by Michiru Ōshima
2000s Chinese films